Tejwant Singh was an Indian politician and member of the Bharatiya Janata Party. Singh was a member of the Himachal Pradesh Legislative Assembly from the Kinnaur constituency in Kinnaur district.

References 

People from Kinnaur district
Bharatiya Janata Party politicians from Himachal Pradesh
Himachal Pradesh MLAs 2007–2012
Living people
21st-century Indian politicians
Speakers of the Himachal Pradesh Legislative Assembly
Year of birth missing (living people)